William or Bill Snyder may refer to:

 William Snyder (photojournalist), American photojournalist
 William Snyder (playwright) (1930–2008), American playwright
 William Snyder (politician) (born 1952), American state legislator in Florida
 William E. Snyder (Medal of Honor) (1883–1944), United States Navy officer and Medal of Honor recipient
 William L. Snyder (1918–1998), American film producer
 William E. Snyder (cinematographer), American cinematographer
 William McKendree Snyder (1848–1930), American painter
 William T. Snyder, American academic and chancellor of the University of Tennessee Knoxville, 1992–1999
 Frank Prinzi, American cinematographer and a television director, sometimes credited as William Snyder
 Will Snyder, part of American country music duo Caitlin & Will
 Bill Snyder (born 1939), American college football coach
 Bill Snyder (animal trainer) (1864–1934), American zookeeper and elephant trainer
 Bill Snyder (baseball) (1898–1934), American Major League Baseball pitcher
 Bill Snyder (bandleader) (1916–2011), American songwriter